Tachymenis is a genus of venomous snakes belonging to the family Colubridae. Species in the genus Tachymenis are commonly known as slender snakes or short-tailed snakes and are primarily found in southern South America. Tachymenis are rear-fanged (opisthoglyphous) and are capable of producing a medically significant bite, with at least one species, T. peruviana, responsible for human fatalities.

Species
The following species are recognized by the Reptile Database.
Tachymenis ocellata Dumeril, Bibron, & Dumeril, 1854 	 	 	
Tachymenis peruviana Wiegmann, 1835
Tachymenis trigonatus (Leybold, 1873)

References

Further reading
Boulenger GA (1896). Catalogue of the Snakes in the British Museum (Natural History). Volume III., Containing the Colubridæ (Opisthoglyphæ and Proteroglyphæ) ... London: Trustees of the British Museum (Natural History). (Taylor and Francis, printers). xiv + 727 pp. + Plates I-XXV. (Genus Tachymenis, pp. 117–118; T. peruviana, p. 118; T. affinis, new species, p. 119 + Plate VII, figure 1 [three views]).
Freiberg M (1982). Snakes of South America. Hong Kong: T.F.H. Publications. 189 pp. . (Tachymenis, pp. 75, 76, 111).
Wiegmann AFA (1835). "Beiträge zur Zoologie, gesammelt auf einer Reise um die Erde, von Dr. F.J.F. Meyen, siebente Abhandlung. Amphibien ". Nova Acta Physico-Medica Academiae Caesareae Leopoldino-Carolinae 17: 185-268. (Tachymenis, new genus, pp. 251–252; T. peruviana, new species, pp. 252–253 + Plate XX, figure 1). (in German and Latin).

Colubrids
Snake genera
Taxa named by Arend Friedrich August Wiegmann